The 2016–17 São Vicente Association Cup season was the 15th of the competition of the Association Cup (equivalent to a League Cup used in other countries, e.g. nearby Senegal) of football in the island of São Vicente, Cape Verde. All of the competition took place in late 2016, the Premier Division of the cup started on October 29 and finished on December 11 and the Second Division of the cup started in December and finished on January 29.  The tournament was organized by the São Vicente Regional Football Association (Associação Regional de São Vicente de Futebol, ARSVF).  Batuque won their only title for the season.

Overview
Amarante was the defending team of the title.  A total of eight clubs competed in the competition and challenged with a different club once in its seven rounds.  All of the clubs were also that would participate in its regional Premier Division later in January 2017.

In the Premier Division, Derby scored the most goals numbering 16, followed by Batuque with 12 and last was Salamansa with only six.  A total of 81 goals were scored.

In its Second Division, São Pedro won the title for the season.

It marked the final appearance of Falcões do Norte at the Premier Division of the Association Cup, they will spend their first season at the Second Division of the Association Cup.

Participating clubs

Premier Division
Académica
 Batuque FC
 FC Derby
 Farense
 Falcões do Norte
 CS Mindelense
 Ribeira Bote
 Salamansa

Second Division
 Amarantes
 Calhau
 Castilho
 Corinthians
 Ponta d’Pom
 São Pedro

Association Cup standings

Premier Division

Second Division
1st place: São Pedro

See also
2016–17 São Vicente Island League

References

External links
*
2016-17 São Vicente Football competitions at RSSSF which includes the opening tournament

São Vicente football seasons
2016–17 in Cape Verdean football